Eduardo Schwank won the last edition in 2009.
Guido Andreozzi won the final 6–3, 6–7(6–8), 6–2 against Facundo Argüello.

Seeds

Draw

Finals

Top half

Bottom half

References
 Main Draw
 Qualifying Draw

Lima Challenger - Singles
2012 Singles